Vicente Guillot Fabián (born 15 July 1941 in Aldaia, Valencian Community) is a retired Spanish footballer.

During his career he played for Mestalla CF, Valencia CF and Elche CF. He also earned 6 caps for the Spain national football team.

International goals

Honours
Valencia
Inter-Cities Fairs Cup: 1961–62, 1962–63
Spanish Cup: 1966–67

External links
 
 National team data 
 
 Valencia CF profile 

1941 births
Living people
People from Horta Oest
Sportspeople from the Province of Valencia
Spanish footballers
Association football forwards
Valencia CF Mestalla footballers
La Liga players
Valencia CF players
Elche CF players
Spain youth international footballers
Spain B international footballers
Spain international footballers